Apache Club de Mitsamiouli is a Comorian football club located in Mitsamiouli, Comoros.  It currently plays in Comoros Premier League.

In 2009 the team has won Comoros Premier League.

Honours
Comoros Premier League: 1
2009

Performance in CAF competitions
CAF Champions League: 1 appearances
2010 – Preliminary round

Stadium
Currently the team plays at the 3000 capacity Stade International Saïd.

External links
Soccerway

Statarea
Football clubs in the Comoros